Engelbert 'Berti' Kraus (30 July 1934 – 14 May 2016) was a German football player. He played in one match at the 1962 FIFA World Cup.

References

External links

1934 births
2016 deaths
German footballers
Germany international footballers
Germany under-21 international footballers
Germany B international footballers
Kickers Offenbach players
TSV 1860 Munich players
Bundesliga players
1962 FIFA World Cup players
Association football forwards
Sportspeople from Offenbach am Main
Footballers from Hesse